Trigger Warning is a collection of short fiction and verse by Neil Gaiman. It was first published in the United States in 2015 by William Morrow. The title is a reference to the concept of trigger warnings, originally intended to warn survivors of sexual abuse or other trauma about potentially graphic content, and its recent prominence in contemporary discourse. In his introduction to the book, Neil Gaiman considers the question of whether stories should be considered "safe spaces", and, concluding that they should not, warns readers that the stories in this collection may disturb them.

Most of the stories in the book are reprints from other sources, such as magazines and anthologies, however "Black Dog", a new short story sequel to American Gods featuring its main character, Shadow, was purpose-written for this collection.

Contents
 Introduction
 Making a Chair
 A Lunar Labyrinth
 The Thing About Cassandra
 Down to a Sunless Sea
 "The Truth Is a Cave in the Black Mountains .. ."
 My Last Landlady
 Adventure Story_
 Orange
 A Calendar of Tales
 The Case of Death and Honey
 The Man Who Forgot Ray Bradbury_
 Jerusalem
 Click-Clack the Rattlebag
 An Invocation of Incuriosity_
 "And Weep, Like Alexander"
 Nothing O'Clock
 Diamonds and Pearls: A Fairy Tale
 The Return of the Thin White Duke
 Feminine Endings
 Observing the Formalities
 The Sleeper and the Spindle
 Witch Work
 In Relig Odhråin
 Black Dog

References

Further reading

American short story collections
2015 short story collections
Short story collections by Neil Gaiman